Monumbo is a Papuan language of Papua New Guinea. There is an early description in German. It is closely related to Lilau.

Phonology
Mambuwan consonants are:
{| 
| p || t || k || q
|-
| ᵐb || ⁿd || ᵑg || 
|-
|  || s ||  || 
|-
|  || z || ɣ || 
|-
| m || n || ŋ || 
|-
|  || l ||  || 
|-
|  || r ||  || 
|-
| w || j ||  || 
|}

Mambuwan vowels are:
{| 
| i ||  || u
|-
| e || ə || o
|-
| ɛ ||  || ɔ
|-
| a ||  || 
|}

Grammar
Monumbo distinguishes five gender classes for singular and dual third-person pronouns, but only two gender classes (masculine and feminine) for third-person plural pronouns, a typologically unusual feature. There are five genders for the third-person pronoun, which are masculine, feminine, neutral, diminutive, and miscellaneous genders.

Mambuwan subject agreement prefixes are:

{| 
!  !! sg !! du !! pl
|-
! 1
| a- || i- || i-
|-
! 2
| si- ~ su- || u- || u-
|-
! 3
| ni- ~ nu- || ma- || gi-
|-
! 3
| w- || wa-
|-
! 3
| i- || ma- || bo-
|-
! 3
| mi- || ba- || 
|-
! 3
| gi- || ga- || 
|}

Mambuwan has a general oblique case marker –unum ~ -Cusum for nouns:
ŋait-unum
fire-OBL
‘in/at/with/through fire’

Mambuwan also makes use of postpositions such as ŋaŋ ‘inside’:
su ŋaŋ
water inside
‘in the water’

Mambuwan has highly complex verbal inflection.

Nouns
Some Mambuwan nouns and their respective plural forms:

{| 
! gloss !! singular !! plural
|-
! ‘mouth’
| alakam || alakambo
|-
! ‘leg’
| sabo || sabo
|-
! ‘thorn’
| pupuk || pupuka
|-
! ‘door’
| kigi || kigika
|-
! ‘stream’
| su || suga
|-
! ‘crab’
| dɔra || dɔrage
|-
! ‘name’
| inu || inuore
|-
! ‘beach’
| lulu || luluore
|-
! ‘coconut’
| dɛ || dɛip
|-
! ‘island’
| mot || motiwe
|-
! ‘hand’
| naŋdabi || naŋdabian
|}

References

Monumbo languages
Languages of Madang Province